Niklas Daniel Falk (born 28 January 1947 in Örgryte, Gothenburg) is a Swedish actor. His brother is actor Jonas Falk. Falk was educated at NAMA in Gothenburg. He worked at Gothenburg City Theatre until 1988. 1990 he moved to Stockholm and Stockholm City Theatre.

Filmography

 2015 – Jönssonligan – Den perfekta stöten
 2009 – The Girl Who Kicked the Hornets' Nest
 2008 – Oskyldigt dömd
Wallander – Innan frosten (2005)
As It Is in Heaven (2004)
 2003 – Norrmalmstorg
Stackars Tom (2002)
2002 - Cleo
 2001 – Rederiet
2001 - Agnes
 2001 – Woman with Birthmark
En förälskelse (2001)
Jönssonligan spelar högt (2000)
 2000 – Brottsvåg
Dödlig drift (1999)
Stjärnsystrar (1999)
 1999 – Reuter & Skoog
 1998 – OP7
 1998 – Ivar Kreuger
 1998 – Zingo
Den tatuerade änkan (1998)
 1997 – Svensson Svensson
Lilla Jönssonligan på styva linan (1997)
Beck – Lockpojken (1997)
Sånt är livet (1996)
 1996 – Skilda världar
Rusar i hans famn (1996)
1995 - Tre kronor
Petri tårar (1995)
 1995 – Anmäld försvunnen
Pillertrillaren (1994)
 1991 – Svindlande affärer
 1989 – Förhöret
 1988 – Enligt beslut
Jungfruresan (1988)
 1984 – Taxibilder
 1981 – Stjärnhuset
 1974 – Fiskeläget

References

External links

Swedish male actors
1947 births
Living people
People from Gothenburg
20th-century Swedish people